The Gold Logie Award for Most Popular Personality on Australian Television, commonly referred to simply as the Gold Logie, is an award presented annually at the Australian Logie Awards. 

The Gold Logie was first awarded at the 2nd Annual TV Week Logie Awards, held in 1960 when the award was originally called Most Popular Personality on Australian Television. It was briefly renamed Best Personality on Australian Television in 2016-2017. For the 2018 ceremony, the award category name was reverted to Most Popular Personality on Australian Television.

The winner and nominees of the Gold Logie are chosen by the public through an online voting survey on the TV Week website. Gold Logies were awarded for separate male and female categories in 1962, 1967, 1970, 1971, and between 1974 and 1977. The most represented programs are The Don Lane Show and Blue Heelers.

Stars with Most Wins

Winners and nominees

Most awarded programs

Notes

References

External links

Awards established in 1960